Petronella Johanna Maria "Nel" Bos (born 23 November 1947) is a retired swimmer from the Netherlands. She competed at the 1968 Summer Olympics in the 100 m freestyle, 100 m butterfly,  freestyle relay and  medley relay and finished in seventh place in the last event.

References

1947 births
Living people
Dutch female freestyle swimmers
Dutch female medley swimmers
Dutch female butterfly swimmers
Olympic swimmers of the Netherlands
Swimmers at the 1968 Summer Olympics
People from Willemstad
20th-century Dutch women